Redigobius bikolanus, the Speckled goby, is a species of goby native to marine, fresh and brackish waters along the coasts of Asia from Japan to Australia out to the Pacific islands of New Caledonia and Vanuatu and along the coast of South Africa and the Seychelles.  This species inhabits streams, creeks and estuaries, often being found upstream beyond the tidal zones of rivers.  This fish can reach a length of  SL.

References

Redigobius
Fish of Asia
Fish of the Philippines
Taxonomy articles created by Polbot
Taxa named by Albert William Herre
Fish described in  1927